Elizabeth Dadzie (born 21 March 1993) is a Ghanaian athlete competing in the combined events. She represented her country at two consecutive Commonwealth Games. She also won two medals at the African Championships.

International competitions

Personal bests
Outdoor
100 metres – 12.17 (+0.2 m/s, Cape Girardeau 2017)	
200 metres – 24.50 (+1.6 m/s,Auburn 2016)
800 metres – 2:19.10 (Gold Coast 2018)
100 metres hurdles – 13.42 (+1.4 m/s,Gulf Shores 2015)
High jump – 1.67 (El Paso 2017)
Long jump – 6.34 (0.0 m/s,El Paso 2017)
Triple jump – 12.35 (0.0 m/s,Mesa 2014)
Shot put – 11.67 (El Paso 2017)
Javelin throw – 40.33 (Durban 2016)
Heptathlon – 5832 (El Paso 2017)
Indoor
60 metres – 8.09 (Nashville 2015)
200 metres – 25.75 (Nashville 2016)
400 metres – 59.07 (Shawnee 2014)
800 metres – 2:26.77 (Birmingham, AL 2018)
60 metres hurdles – 8.47 (Geneva, OH 2015)
High jump – 1.59 (Birmingham, AL 2018)
Long jump – 6.23 (New York 2014)
Triple jump – 12.40 (Geneva, OH 2015)
Shot put – 11.42 (Warrensburg 2015)
Pentathlon – 3758 (Birmingham 2018) NR

References

1993 births
Living people
Ghanaian heptathletes
Sportspeople from Accra
Athletes (track and field) at the 2014 Commonwealth Games
Athletes (track and field) at the 2018 Commonwealth Games
Commonwealth Games competitors for Ghana
Ghanaian expatriate sportspeople in the United States
Middle Tennessee Blue Raiders women's track and field athletes
African Games competitors for Ghana
Athletes (track and field) at the 2015 African Games